The Nabesna River (Naambia Niign in Upper Tanana) is a  tributary of the Tanana River in the U.S. state of Alaska. Beginning at Nabesna Glacier in the Alaska Range, it flows north-northeast from Wrangell–St. Elias National Park and Preserve to join the Chisana River near Northway Junction. The combined rivers form the Tanana.

Boating
The Nabesna River, swift-flowing in its upper reaches, passes through a deep valley that opens into broad plain. Gradually slowing, the river enters the Tetlin National Wildlife Refuge, a region of marshes, hills, lakes, and forests of spruce and birch.

The river, suited to running by rafts, hard-shelled kayaks, or decked canoes, is rated Class I (easy) to Class II (medium) on the International Scale of River Difficulty. The current is swift on the stream's upper  and slow from there to the mouth. Dangers include cold, swift, silty water, and braided channels. Glacier melt may cause flow rates to rise significantly between morning and afternoon on warm days.

Fishing
The Nabesna is a popular fishing site in Alaska. Species such as the Rainbow Trout, King Salmon, Red Salmon and Coho Salmon.

See also
 List of rivers of Alaska

References

Rivers of Alaska
Rivers of Copper River Census Area, Alaska
Rivers of Southeast Fairbanks Census Area, Alaska
Rivers of Unorganized Borough, Alaska
Tributaries of the Yukon River
Tanana Athabaskans